State Trunk Highway 32 (often called Highway 32, STH-32 or WIS 32) is a state highway in the U.S. state of Wisconsin that runs north–south in the eastern part of the state. It runs from the Illinois border (at Illinois Route 137) north to the Michigan border (concurrent with U.S. Highway 45). It is named the 32nd Division Memorial Highway  after the U.S. 32nd Infantry Division, and the highway shields have red arrows—the division's logo—on either side of the number 32. The route of WIS 32 and the Red Arrow marking is set in state statute by the Wisconsin Legislature.

Route description

Illinois state line to Milwaukee

At the Illinois state line, IL 137 ends while WIS 32 begins as a continuation of it. From then on, it intersects WIS 165, WIS 50 and WIS 158 in Kenosha, and WIS 11 in Racine. Then, as WIS 32 nearly reaches Racine, Sheridan Road ends and continues as Racine Street. Then, in downtown Racine, WIS 20 runs concurrently with WIS 32 for 10 blocks. Also, east of the roundabout, the concurrency splits into a one-way pair (6th Street westbound; 7th Street eastbound). At Main Street, WIS 32 turns north while WIS 20 ends there. South of the bascule bridge, WIS 32 intersects WIS 38. After the crossing, it bends west at Hamilton Street and then north at Douglas Avenue. Further north, it intersects WIS 31 in the middle of Oak Creek and Racine and WIS 100 in Oak Creek. In South Milwaukee, it bends east from Chicago Avenue via Marquette Avenue, crossing under a  railroad overpass, and then back north via 10th Avenue. At the South Milwaukee-Cudahy town line, WIS 32 turns east via College Avenue and then back north again via Lake Drive. In St. Francis, it turns west via Howard Avenue and then back north again via Kinnickinnic Avenue.

Milwaukee
In the Bay View neighborhood, it crosses under Lake Parkway (WIS 794) without a direct interchange and a railroad overpasses. At another bascule bridge near another neighborhood called Harbor View, it crosses over the Kinnickinnic River and then crosses under another railroad overpass. In this neighborhood, it transitions into 1st Street. Then, it intersects WIS 59 and then bends east via Pittsburgh Avenue just north of the two overpasses. After another bascule bridge, it enters the Historic Third Ward where it briefly transitions into Young Street. It then travels north via Milwaukee Street, following part of the streetcar route. At this point, WIS 32 splits again, this time as a two-way pair.

For northbound traffic, it continues north until it reaches Wells Street where it turns east. Between Michigan and Wells Streets, westbound US 18 concurrently follows northbound WIS 32. It then travels north via Prospect Avenue. It then reaches State Street where the split ends.

For southbound traffic, it diverges west via State Street. Then, it travels south via Broadway and then east via St Paul Avenue. This time, US 18 concurrently follows two sections of southbound WIS 32. There is one on State Street between Milwaukee Street and Broadway (for westbound US 18) and another between Wells and Michigan Streets (eastbound US 18). Both directions cross under Interstate 794 east of the Marquette Interchange.

After that, another split happens. This time, it is another one-way pair. Northbound traffic continues to follow Prospect Avenue. On the other hand, southbound traffic continues to follow Bradford Avenue, then Farwell Avenue, and then Franklin Place. WIS 32 then turns north onto Lake Drive.

Milwaukee to Green Bay
In Shorewood, WIS 32 intersects WIS 190. In Bayside, WIS 32 bends west, leaving Lake Drive northward. As a result, WIS 32 transitions into Brown Deer Road. At the cloverleaf interchange, WIS 100 ends where WIS 32 merges onto I-43. They come across WIS 57/WIS 167 at a diamond interchange (only WIS 57 travels concurrently with the other two routes), and WIS 60 at another diamond interchange. At another diamond interchange (exit 93), WIS 32 diverged in favor of serving Port Washington. In Port Washington, it intersects WIS 33, turns east onto Grand Avenue, then turns north onto Franklin Street, and then shifts west onto Wisconsin Street. In Knellsville, WIS 32 travels back and merge onto I-43 (WIS 57 already left I-43 north of Saukville). It eventually leaves I-43 east of Cedar Grove. Further north, it intersects WIS 28 at a roundabout, goes through Sheboygan Falls, intersects WIS 23 at a diamond interchange, and WIS 42 (which turns northwest). In Millhome, WIS 57 then follows another concurrency with WIS 32. They then intersect WIS 67 in Kiel, US 151 in Chilton (which briefly runs concurrently with them), WIS 114 in Hilbert, US 10 at a roundabout in Forest Junction, and WIS 96 at another roundabout in Greenleaf. In De Pere, WIS 32 branches off west from WIS 57. It then turns north from Main Avenue to Eighth Street. It intersects another roundabout that leads to I-41 southbound. It also intersects two separate roads that lead to WIS 172 freeway. It then merges onto westbound Mason Street (WIS 54) from a diamond interchange.

Green Bay to Michigan state line
WIS 32 then leaves WIS 54 at the dumbbell interchange and then briefly enters I-41. It then branches off west from I-41 at the directional T interchange. WIS 29 then merges onto a limited–access road where WIS 32 runs; concurring with WIS 32. WIS 32 then branches off north from the WIS 29 expressway (which intersects WIS 156). Further north, WIS 32 intersects with WIS 160 in Pulaski, then runs concurrently with WIS 22 at Gillett and then with WIS 64, and then intersects WIS 52 at Wabeno. Also, it then runs concurrently with US 8 and WIS 55 from Laona to Crandon and Crandon to Argonne respectively. Going further northwest, it eventually runs concurrently with US 45 for the rest of the route. As they reach Eagle River, they run concurrently with WIS 70; turning west and then north again. Not only that, they run concurrently with WIS 17 as well after WIS 70 branches off west. They continue north until they reach the state line where WIS 32 ends.

History

Initially, WIS 32 ran from WIS 14 (now WIS 55/US 8) in Crandon to WIS 10 (now US 51) near Arbor Vitae via parts of present-day WIS 32 and WIS 70. In 1919, WIS 32 moved away from WIS 10 near Arbor Vitae to M-26 at the Michigan state line in State Line (now Land O' Lakes). That same year, WIS 32 extended from Crandon to Green Bay via most of present-day WIS 32. In 1923, WIS 26 replaced the northernmost part of WIS 32 from Eagle River to Michigan state line. That same year, WIS 32 extended south and then southeast to Sheboygan. The southern extension roughly followed parts of present-day WIS 57, CTH-PP, CTH-W, US 151, WIS 67, WIS 32, and WIS 42.

In 1935, US 45 extended north from Des Plaines, Illinois, to Ontonagon, Michigan. In Wisconsin, it followed most of WIS 26.

In 1951, WIS 32 had undergone significant changes. It was designated as the 32nd Division Memorial Highway. The WIS 32 markers had since contained two red arrows pointing up (the only state trunk highway to have that in Wisconsin). It also became a state-to-state highway. That means that it brought back the northernmost portion of it but did not remove US 45. WIS 42 was also replaced south of Howards Grove as part of the designation, giving WIS 32 the routing WIS 42 formerly served in Port Washington, Milwaukee, Racine, Kenosha, and Illinois instead of Sheboygan. In the 1980s, WIS 32 from Kiel to De Pere was pushed westward to run concurrently with more sections of WIS 57. This was done in favor of transferring part of it from state maintenance to local control (now signed as CTH-W/CTH-PP).

Major intersections

See also

 Sheridan Road, the highway's designation through much of Kenosha and Racine

References

External links

032
Lake Michigan Circle Tour
Transportation in Kenosha County, Wisconsin
Transportation in Racine County, Wisconsin
Transportation in Milwaukee County, Wisconsin
Transportation in Ozaukee County, Wisconsin
Transportation in Sheboygan County, Wisconsin
Transportation in Manitowoc County, Wisconsin
Transportation in Calumet County, Wisconsin
Transportation in Brown County, Wisconsin
Transportation in Shawano County, Wisconsin
Transportation in Oconto County, Wisconsin
Transportation in Forest County, Wisconsin
Transportation in Oneida County, Wisconsin
Transportation in Vilas County, Wisconsin